"Run2U" (stylized in all caps) is a song recorded by South Korean girl group STAYC for their second extended play Young-Luv.com. It was released as the lead single by High Up Entertainment on February 21, 2022.

Background and release
On January 28, 2022, High Up Entertainment announced STAYC would be releasing a new album in February 2022. On February 8, it was announced STAYC would be releasing their second extended play Young-Luv.com on February 21. On February 16, the music video teaser was released. A day later, the highlight medley video teaser was released. On February 20, the second music video teaser was released. The song alongside the music video was released on February 21.

Composition
"Run2U" was written by B.E.P and Jeon Goon, with composition handled by the duo alongside FLYT, and arranged by Rado and FLYT. The song was described as song with "retro synth sound" with lyrics that "freely express the desire to run towards you with fearing for love, regardless of what others opinion". "Run2U" was composed in the key of B minor, with a tempo of 130 beats per minute.

Commercial performance
"Run2U" debuted at number 29 on South Korea's Gaon Digital Chart in the chart issue dated March 5, 2022; on its component charts, the song debuted at number four on the Gaon Download Chart, and number 54 on the Gaon Streaming Chart. The song ascended to number four on the Gaon Digital Chart, and number five on the Gaon Streaming Chart in the chart issue dated March 6–12, 2022.

On the Billboard K-pop Hot 100, the song debuted at number 50 in the chart issue dated March 5, 2022, ascending to number three in the chart issue dated March 26, 2022. The song debuted at number 13 on the Billboard South Korea Songs in the chart issue dated May 7, 2022. In New Zealand, the song debuted at number 29 on the RMNZ Hot Singles in the chart issue dated February 28, 2022. In Singapore, the song debuted at number 22 on the RIAS Top Regional Chart in the chart issue dated February 18–24, 2022. In United States, the song debuted at number nine on the Billboard World Digital Song Sales in the chart issue dated March 5, 2022.

Promotion
Prior to the extended play's release, on February 21, 2022, STAYC held a live showcase on YouTube to introduce the extended play and communicate with their fans. The group subsequently performed on four music programs on the first week: Mnet's M Countdown on February 24, KBS's Music Bank on February 25, MBC's Show! Music Core on February 26, and SBS's Inkigayo on February 27. On the second week, the group performed on six music programs: SBS MTV's The Show on March 1 where they won first place, MBC M's Show Champion on March 2, Mnet's M Countdown on March 3, KBS's Music Bank on March 4 where they won first place, MBC's Show! Music Core on March 5, and SBS's Inkigayo on March 6. On the third week, the group performed on two music programs: SBS MTV's The Show on March 8, and MBC M's Show Champion on March 9, where they won first place in both appearances.

Credits and personnel
Credits adapted from Melon.

Studio
 Ingrid Studio – recording, digital editing
 Koko Sound Studio – mixing
 Metropolis Mastering Studios – mastering

Personnel
 STAYC – vocals
 STAYC (Sieun) – background vocals
 Jeon Goon – background vocals, lyrics, composition
 FLYT – composition, arrangement, keyboard, bass
 Rado – arrangement, drums
 B.E.P – lyrics, composition
 Jung Eun-kyung – recording, digital editing
 DRK – mixing
 Kim Jun-sang – mixing (assistant)
 Kim Min-woo – mixing (assistant)
 Stuart Hawkes – mastering

Charts

Weekly charts

Year-end chart

Accolades

Release history

References

STAYC songs
2022 songs
2022 singles
Korean-language songs